That Don't Make Me a Bad Guy is the twelfth studio album by American country music artist Toby Keith. It was released on October 28, 2008 by Show Dog Nashville, Keith's own label. The album's lead-off single, "She Never Cried in Front of Me", reached number one on the US Billboard Hot Country Songs chart in late October 2008, as did "God Love Her", the second single, in March 2009. The third single, "Lost You Anyway", was released on March 16, 2009. The album was certified Gold by the RIAA. Keith wrote or co-wrote all the songs on this album, collaborating with Bobby Pinson on all but three.

Track listing
All songs written by Toby Keith and Bobby Pinson except where noted.
 "That Don't Make Me a Bad Guy" - 3:42
 "Creole Woman" - 4:33
 "God Love Her" (Keith, Vicky McGehee) - 3:37
 "Lost You Anyway" - 3:39
 "Missing Me Some You" (Keith) - 4:46
 "Hurt a Lot Worse When You Go" - 4:22
 "Time That It Would Take" - 3:22
 "You Already Love Me" - 3:34
 "She Never Cried in Front of Me" - 4:01
 "Cabo San Lucas" (Keith, Eddy Raven) - 3:09
 "I Got It for You Girl" - 3:12

Chart performance

Weekly charts

Year-end charts

Personnel
Perry Coleman – background vocals
Eric Darken – percussion
Shannon Forrest – drums
Paul Franklin – steel guitar, dobro
Kenny Greenberg – electric guitar
Rob Hajacos – fiddle
Vicki Hampton – background vocals
Mark Hill – bass guitar
Jim Hoke – tenor saxophone
Charles Judge – keyboards, piano
Toby Keith – lead vocals, background vocals, acoustic guitar
Jerry McPherson – electric guitar
Brent Mason – electric guitar
Steve Nathan – keyboards, piano
Steve Patrick – trumpet
Scat Springs – background vocals
Ilya Toshinsky – acoustic guitar, banjo, mandolin
Glenn Worf – bass guitar

References

External links
 

2008 albums
Toby Keith albums
Show Dog-Universal Music albums
Albums produced by Toby Keith